Geeraerts and variant Geeraert are surnames. They may refer to:


Geeraert
Hendrik Geeraert (1863–1925), Belgian folk hero
René Geeraert (1908–1999), Belgian middle-distance runner

Geeraerts
Dirk Geeraerts (born 1955), Belgian linguist
Jan Geeraerts (1814–1890), Belgian painter
Jef Geeraerts (1930–2015), Belgian writer
Marten Jozef Geeraerts (1707–1791), Flemish painter

Other uses
13027 Geeraerts, a minor planet named after Jef Geeraerts

See also
 Karel Geraerts (born 1982), Belgian footballer
 Marcus Gheeraerts (disambiguation)